This is a list of flag bearers who have represented Eswatini at the Olympics.

Flag bearers carry the national flag of their country at the opening ceremony of the Olympic Games.

See also
Eswatini at the Olympics

References

Eswatini at the Olympics
Eswatini
Olympic flagbearers